Events from the year 1217 in Ireland.

Incumbent
Lord: Henry III

Events
 Magna Carta was extended to Ireland in the Great Charter of Ireland

Births

Deaths

References

 
1210s in Ireland
Ireland
Years of the 13th century in Ireland